The 1993 Welsh local elections,  were held on 6 May in 8 local authorities, as part of the wider 1993 UK local elections.

Wales-Wide Results

Result

In all 8 Welsh county councils the whole of the council was up for election.

Notes

References

 
1993 elections in the United Kingdom
Welsh
1993
May 1993 events in the United Kingdom